Al-Falluja Sport Club, is an Iraqi football team based in Fallujah, Al-Anbar, that plays in Iraq Division Three.

Stadium
The Al-Fallujah Stadium was rehabilitated in 2013 by the Ministry of Youth and Sports, and after this year, ISIS took control of the Al-Fallujah Stadium when it occupied the Al Anbar Governorate. In June 2016, the Iraqi Armed Forces managed to liberate the Fallujah areas, including the stadium. The stadium was reconstructed starting in 2017, Then was vandalized as a result of the families displaced from Syria housing in it, and in 2021 the stadium was rehabilitated again, and the team returned to play on its ground.

Managerial history
 Mohammed Marzouq
 Saadi Awad Al-Kubaisi 
 Ahmed Fadhel 
 Abdullah Jassim

See also 
 1977–78 Iraq FA Cup
 1989–90 Iraq FA Cup
 1991–92 Iraq FA Cup
 1992–93 Iraq FA Cup
 2001–02 Iraq FA Cup
 2002–03 Iraq FA Cup
 2021–22 Iraq FA Cup

References

External links
 Al-Falluja SC on Goalzz.com
 Iraq Clubs- Foundation Dates

1968 establishments in Iraq
Association football clubs established in 1968
Football clubs in Al-Anbar